Cassius Chiyanika (born March 1, 1984 in Maamba, Sinazongwe District) is a Zambian amateur boxer who competed at the 2008 Olympics at flyweight.

He competed in the Commonwealth 2006 Games at junior fly but lost his first bout.

He went up to flyweight when Kennedy Kanyanta turned pro and won the 2nd AIBA African 2008 Olympic Qualifying Tournament beating fighters like Jackson Chauke thus qualifying for Beijing.

He lost his Olympic debut to Italian favorite Vincenzo Picardi 3:10.

External links
 
 Bio
 Qualifier

1984 births
Living people
Flyweight boxers
Boxers at the 2006 Commonwealth Games
Commonwealth Games competitors for Zambia
Boxers at the 2008 Summer Olympics
Olympic boxers of Zambia
Zambian male boxers
People from Sinazongwe District